The Urtatagai conflict was a conflict between the Emirate of Afghanistan and the Russian Empire over control of the island of Urtatagai, which took place 1913. It began in November, when Afghan troops were deployed on Urtatagai after it had merged with the Afghan bank, placing it within Afghan territory. Sometime later, the flow of the river once again separated the island, and on an agreement on 13 December at Askhabad, the Afghan leadership agreed to return the island, ending the conflict.

References 

Conflicts in 1913
Wars involving Afghanistan
Wars involving the Soviet Union
1913 in Afghanistan